Jakub Szymanski (born 9 February 1983) is a Czech handball player. He plays for TSV St. Otmar St. Gallen and the Czech national team. He participated at the 2015 World Men's Handball Championship in Qatar.

References

1983 births
Living people
Czech male handball players
People from Havířov
Sportspeople from the Moravian-Silesian Region